Annie Raoult (born 14 December 1951) is a French applied mathematician specializing in the mathematical modeling of cell membranes, graphene sheets, and other thin nanostructures. She is vice president of the Centre International de Mathématiques Pures et Appliquées and professor emerita at Paris Descartes University, where she directed the laboratory for applied mathematics.

Education and career
She became a professor at Joseph Fourier University in Grenoble in 1992, and remained there until 2005, also serving as deputy director of the computer science and applied mathematics laboratories UFR and UJF from 1996 to 2001. In 2005 she came to Paris Descartes University as a professor, and from 2009 to 2014 she directed the laboratory for applied mathematics (MAP5) at Paris Descartes University. In 2017 she became vice president of the Centre International de Mathématiques Pures et Appliquées (CIMPA), and later the same year retired from Paris Descartes University to become a professor emerita.

Recognition
In 2000, Raoult won the Prix Paul Doistau–Émile Blutet of the French Academy of Sciences in the area of mechanical and computational sciences.

References

External links
Home page

1951 births
Living people
French mathematicians
French women mathematicians
Applied mathematicians